La Campana National Park is located in the Cordillera de la Costa, Quillota Province, in the Valparaíso Region of Chile. La Campana National Park and the Vizcachas Mountains lie northwest of Santiago. Another attraction is the Cerro La Campana, which lends its name to the park. In 1834 Charles Darwin climbed this mountain, during the second voyage of HMS Beagle.

In 1984, the park, along with Lago Peñuelas National Reserve, was designated by UNESCO as a Biosphere Reserve.

Biology
The park is in the Chilean Matorral Ecoregion. Chilean Wine Palm groves occur in the Ocoa Valley. Other typical vegetation species occurring in the park include the Echinopsis chiloensis, Puya chilensis Roble, Boldo, Litre, Peumo, Patagua, Winter's Bark and Lingue.

See also
Avellanita bustillosii
Chicauma
Cuesta La Dormida
La Campana-Peñuelas Biosphere Reserve
Porlieria chilensis

References
C. Michael Hogan (2008) Chilean Wine Palm: Jubaea chilensis, GlobalTwitcher.com, ed. N. Stromberg
Mediterranean Region and La Campana National Park, Chile
UNESCO. 2007. La Campana-Peñuelas Biosphere Reserve

Line notes

External links

 CONAF: Parque Nacional La Campana

Protected areas established in 1967
Protected areas of Valparaíso Region
National parks of Chile